Atlantic Bank of New York is a bank holding company and a subsidiary of New York Community Bank.

History
In 1926, Bank of Athens Trust Company, a subsidiary of Bank of Athens, received a bank charter in New York State.

In 1952, the bank changed its name to Atlantic Bank of New York.

In 1953, the bank acquired Hellenic Bank Trust Company.

In 1959, the bank acquired Bankatlanta Safe Deposit Company.
 
In 2002, the bank acquired Yonkers S&L.

In 2006, the bank was acquired by New York Community Bank for $400 million. and Mr. Spiros J. Voutsinas appointed President of Atlantic Bank.

In 2014, Spiros J. Voutsinas, the president & chief executive officer of the bank, died.
In July 2014, Nancy Papaioannou was elected President of Atlantic Bank of New York, division of New York Commercial Bank.≤5≥

References

5.New York Commercial Bank Press Release July 30, 2014.

Banks established in 1926